Charles Raymond Starkweather (November 24, 1938 – June 25, 1959) was an American spree killer who murdered eleven people in Nebraska and Wyoming between December 1957 and January 1958, when he was nineteen years old. He killed ten of his victims between January 21 and January 29, 1958, the date of his arrest. During his spree in 1958, Starkweather was accompanied by his fourteen-year-old girlfriend, Caril Ann Fugate.

Both Starkweather and Fugate were convicted on charges for their parts in the homicides; Starkweather was sentenced to death and executed seventeen months after the events. Fugate served seventeen years in prison, gaining release in 1976. Starkweather's execution by electric chair in 1959 was the last execution in Nebraska until 1994, when Harold Lamont Otey was executed for murder.

The Starkweather case has been analyzed by criminologists and psychologists in an attempt to understand spree killers' motivations and precipitating factors. It also became notorious as one of the earlier crime scandals that reached national prominence, much like the kidnapping of Charles Lindbergh's son with the media outlets covering the case at the time openly condemning Starkweather.

Early life
Starkweather was born in Lincoln, Nebraska, the third of seven children of Guy and Helen Starkweather. The Starkweathers were a working-class family; Starkweather's father was a carpenter who was often unemployed due to rheumatoid arthritis in his hands; Helen worked as a waitress to supplement the family's income. Starkweather's great-great grandfather, George Anson Starkweather, was a member of the United States House of Representatives from New York's 21st district 1847–1849.

Starkweather attended Saratoga Elementary School, Irving Junior High School, and Lincoln High School. In contrast to his family life, Starkweather later recalled nothing positive of his time at school. He was born with genu varum, a mild birth defect that caused his legs to be misshapen, and was teased by classmates because he had a speech impediment.

As he grew older and stronger, the only subject in which Starkweather excelled was gym, where he found an outlet for his rage against those who bullied him. Starkweather then began to bully those who had once picked on him. Eventually he felt rage against anyone he disliked. In this period as a young teenager, Starkweather went from being one of the most well-behaved teenagers in the community to one of the most troubled. His high school friend Bob von Busch would later recall:

By the time Starkweather dropped out of school, his parents and family were reportedly afraid of him due to his violent outbursts.

Relationship with Caril Ann Fugate

In 1956, at eighteen, Starkweather was introduced to thirteen-year-old Caril Ann Fugate. Starkweather dropped out of high school in his senior year and took a job at a newspaper warehouse because it was near Fugate's school; he began to visit her every day after school.

Starkweather taught Fugate how to drive, and one day she crashed the car belonging to Starkweather's father, who banished Starkweather from the family home. Starkweather quit his warehouse job and became a garbage collector.

Starkweather began developing a nihilistic worldview, believing that his current situation was the final determinant of how he would live the rest of his life, while striving only to satisfy his biological needs and acquire power over others. He began plotting bank robberies, and settled on a personal philosophy: "Dead people are all on the same level".

First murder
Late on November 30, 1957, Starkweather became angry at Robert Colvert, a service station attendant in Lincoln, for refusing to sell him a stuffed animal on credit. He returned several times during the night to purchase small items, until finally, brandishing a shotgun, he forced Colvert to give him $100 from the till. He drove Colvert to a remote area, where they struggled over the gun, injuring Colvert before Starkweather killed him with several shots.

1958 murder spree
On January 21, 1958, Starkweather went to Fugate's home. Fugate's mother and stepfather, Velda and Marion Bartlett, told him to stay away. He fatally shot them, then clubbed to death their two-year-old daughter Betty Jean. He hid the bodies behind the house.

Starkweather later said that Caril was there the entire time, but she said that when she arrived home, Starkweather met her with a gun and said that her family was being held hostage. She said Starkweather told her that if she cooperated with him, her family would be safe; otherwise, they would be killed. The pair remained in the house until shortly before the police, alerted by Fugate's suspicious grandmother, arrived on January 27.

Starkweather and Fugate drove to the farmhouse of seventy-year-old August Meyer, one of her family's friends who lived in Bennet, Nebraska. Starkweather killed him with a shotgun blast to the head. He also killed Meyer's dog.

Fleeing the area, the pair drove their car into mud and abandoned the vehicle. When Robert Jensen and Carol King, two local teenagers, stopped to give them a ride, Starkweather forced them to drive back to an abandoned storm cellar in Bennet. He shot Jensen in the back of the head. He attempted to rape King, but was unable to do so. He became angry with her and fatally shot her as well. Starkweather later admitted shooting Jensen, but claimed that Fugate shot King. Fugate said she had stayed in the car the entire time. The two fled Bennet in Jensen's car.

Starkweather and Fugate drove to a wealthy section of Lincoln, where they entered the home of industrialist C. Lauer Ward and his wife Clara. Starkweather stabbed their maid Ludmila "Lilyan" Fencl to death, then waited for Lauer and Clara to return home. Starkweather killed the family dog by breaking its neck, to keep it from alerting the Wards. Clara arrived first alone, and was also stabbed to death. Starkweather later admitted to having thrown a knife at Clara, but insisted that Fugate had stabbed her numerous times, killing her. When Lauer Ward returned home that evening, Starkweather shot and killed him. Starkweather and Fugate filled Ward's black 1956 Packard with stolen jewelry from the house and fled Nebraska.

The murders of the Wards and Fencl caused an uproar within Lancaster County. Law enforcement agencies in the region sent their officers on a house-to-house search for the perpetrators. Governor Victor Emanuel Anderson contacted the Nebraska National Guard, and the Lincoln chief of police called for a block-by-block search of that city. After several sightings of Starkweather and Fugate were reported, the Lincoln Police Department was accused of incompetence for being unable to capture the pair.

Needing a new car because of Ward's Packard having been identified, the couple came upon traveling salesman Merle Collison sleeping in his Buick along the highway outside Douglas, Wyoming. After Collison was awakened, he was fatally shot. Starkweather later accused Fugate of performing a coup-de-grace after his shotgun jammed. Starkweather claimed Fugate was the "most trigger-happy person" he had ever met. Fugate denied ever having killed anyone.

The salesman's car had a parking brake, which was something new to Starkweather. While he attempted to drive away, the car stalled because the brake had not been released. He tried to restart the engine, and a passing motorist, geologist Joe Sprinkle, stopped to help. Starkweather threatened him with the rifle, and an altercation ensued. At that moment, Natrona County Sheriff's Deputy William Romer arrived on the scene. Fugate ran to him, yelling something to the effect of: "It's Starkweather! He's going to kill me!"

A bullet fired by Sheriff Earl Heflin shattered the windshield and flying glass cut Starkweather deep enough to cause bleeding. He stopped, surrendered, and was captured near Douglas, Wyoming on January 29, 1958. Converse County Sheriff Earl Heflin said, "He thought he was bleeding to death. That's why he stopped. That's the kind of yellow son of a bitch he is."

Trial and execution
Starkweather chose to be extradited from Wyoming to Nebraska. He and Fugate arrived there in late January 1958. He believed that either state would have executed him. He was not aware, however, that Milward Simpson, Wyoming's governor at the time, opposed the death penalty. Starkweather first said that he had kidnapped Fugate and that she had nothing to do with the murders. However, he changed his story several times. He testified against her at her trial, saying that she was a willing participant.

Fugate has always maintained that Starkweather was holding her hostage by threatening to kill her family, claiming she was unaware they were already dead. Judge Harry A. Spencer did not believe Fugate was held hostage by Starkweather, as he determined she had had numerous opportunities to escape. When Starkweather was first taken to the Nebraska penitentiary after his trial, he said that he believed that he was supposed to die. He said if he was to be executed, then Fugate should be also.

Starkweather was convicted for the murder of Jensen, the only murder for which he was tried. On May 23, 1958, he was sentenced to death, and Starkweather was executed in the electric chair at the Nebraska State Penitentiary in Lincoln, Nebraska, at 12:04 a.m. on June 25, 1959. Half-hour before the execution, the doctor who was supposed to pronounce Starkweather dead, B.A. Finkel, himself suffered a fatal heart attack. Starkweather gave no last words but in a letter from prison to his parents, wrote: "but dad I'm not real sorry for what I did cause for the first time me and Caril have (sic) more fun." He was reportedly indifferent about his impending death and had become resigned to his fate.

Following the execution, Starkweather was buried in Wyuka Cemetery in Lincoln, as are five of his victims, including Mr. and Mrs. Carl Ward.

Fugate was convicted as an accomplice and received a life sentence on November 21, 1958. She was paroled in June 1976 after serving seventeen-and-a-half-years at the Nebraska Correctional Center for Women in York, Nebraska. She settled in Hillsdale, Michigan.

Victims
 Robert Colvert (21), gas station attendant
 Marion Bartlett (58), Fugate's stepfather
 Velda Bartlett (36), Fugate's mother
 Betty Jean Bartlett (2), Velda and Marion Bartlett's daughter; Fugate's half sister
 August Meyer (70), Fugate's family's friend
 Robert Jensen (17), boyfriend to Carol King
 Carol King (16), girlfriend to Robert Jensen
 Lillian Fencl (51), Clara Ward's maid
 Clara Ward (46), C. Lauer Ward's wife
 C. Lauer Ward (47), wealthy industrialist
 Merle Collison (34), traveling salesman

Starkweather also killed two family dogs of people whom he murdered.

In popular culture

Representation in film and television
 The Starkweather–Fugate case inspired the films The Sadist (1963), Badlands (1973), Kalifornia (1993), Natural Born Killers (1994), and Starkweather (2004).
 "A Case Study of Two Savages," a 1962 episode of the TV series Naked City, was also inspired by the Starkweather killings.
 The 1968 first season Robert Stack-segment episode; 'The Bobby Currier Story', of The Name of the Game, was also based on these events.
 The made-for-TV movie Murder in the Heartland (1993) is a biographical depiction of Starkweather, with Tim Roth in the starring role.
 Stark Raving Mad (1981), a feature film starring Russell Fast and Marcie Severson, is a fictionalized account of the Starkweather–Fugate murder spree.
 The Peter Jackson film The Frighteners (1996) features a Starkweather-inspired killer who goes on a similar murder spree, and has a female accomplice.
 The fourth episode, "Dangerous Liaisons" (aired September 2, 2010), of season four from the ID series, Deadly Women, covers the murders.
"Teenage Wasteland", the Season 4 premiere episode (aired December 6, 2016) from the ID series A Crime to Remember, also covers the Starkweather–Fugate murder spree.
In "Fun with Chemistry", Season 1 Episode 7 of Breakout Kings, Starkweather and Fugate are mention as spree killers.
"The 12th Victim" (2023) Showtime limited series focuses on Caril Ann Fugate's role in the crime spree.

Literature
 Wright Morris' 1960 novel Ceremony at Lone Tree is based, in part, on Starkweather's murders.
 The 1974 book Caril is an unauthorized biography of Caril Ann Fugate written by Ninette Beaver.
 Liza Ward, the granddaughter of victims C. Lauer and Clara Ward, wrote the novel Outside Valentine (2004), based on the events of the Starkweather–Fugate murders.
 The novel Not Comin' Home to You (1974) by Lawrence Block has fictional events that are similar to the Starkweather and Fugate spree.
 Horror author Stephen King has said that he was strongly influenced by reading about the Starkweather murders when he was a youth, and that he kept a scrapbook of articles about them.

Visual arts
 In 2011, art photographer Christian Patterson released Redheaded Peckerwood, a collection of photos made each January from 2005 to 2010 along the 500-mile route traversed by Starkweather and Fugate. The book includes reproductions of documents and photographs of objects that belonged to Starkweather, Fugate, and their victims. Patterson had discovered several of these objects while making his photographs and they had never been seen publicly before or identified with these figures.
 The comic book series Northlanders referred to the murder spree in its 2010 story arc Metal.

Music

 Bruce Springsteen's 1982 song "Nebraska" is a first-person narrative based on the Starkweather murders.
 J Church's 1993 song "Hate So Real" retells the Starkweather murders.
 "Starkweather homicide" is referenced in the lyrics to singer-songwriter Billy Joel's 1989 music single, "We Didn't Start the Fire".
 The 2009 Church of Misery song "Badlands (Charles Starkweather & Caril Fugate)" is about the Starkweather murders.
 A picture of Starkweather's arrest was used as a backdrop on singer-songwriter Morrissey's 2019 live tour, during the song "Jack The Ripper".
 Nicole Dollanganger's 2012 song Nebraska details the events of the Starkweather murders.
 The band Blood for Blood featured a photo of Charles Starkweather on the cover of their 1997 7” Enemy.
 The Philadelphia metalcore band Starkweather took their name from Charles Starkweather.
 "C.Redux" is a menacing ode to the legend of Charles Starkweather and Caril Ann Fugate by the Washington D.C. proto-punk band (The) Razz.

Video games
 Lionel Starkweather, a snuff film director inspired by the eponymous murderer, is the primary antagonist in the stealth-horror game Manhunt. He is voiced by Brian Cox.

See also
 Capital punishment in Nebraska
 Crime in Nebraska
 List of people executed in Nebraska
 List of rampage killers in the United States

Footnotes

References
Allen, William. Starkweather: Inside the Mind of a Teenage Killer. (2004), Emmis Books, 240 pages. 
 
Del Harding, reporter for the Lincoln, Nebr., Star, who covered the murders, the Starkweather and Fugate trials, and Starkweather's execution.

External links
 Bardsley, Marilyn. Charles Starkweather & Caril Fugate. Crime Library. Retrieved on 2009-07-30.

  "Redheaded Peckerwood" on Christian Patterson web site.
 Nebraska State Historical Society
 Life Magazine article Feb. 10, 1958

1938 births
1959 deaths
1957 murders in the United States
20th-century American criminals
American male criminals
20th-century executions by Nebraska
20th-century executions of American people
American murderers of children
American people executed for murder
American robbers
American spree killers
Burials in Nebraska
Criminals from Nebraska
Executed spree killers
People convicted of murder by Nebraska
People executed by Nebraska by electric chair
Executed people from Nebraska
People from Lincoln, Nebraska
History of Lincoln, Nebraska
People with speech impediment
Criminal duos
Family murders
Familicides